Parliamentary elections were held in Norway on 16 October 1933. The result was a victory for the Labour Party, which won 69 of the 150 seats in the Storting.

Results

Seat distribution

Notes

References

General elections in Norway
1930s elections in Norway
Norway
Parliamentary
Norway